Kashipur Assembly constituency is an assembly constituency in Purulia district in the Indian state of West Bengal.

Overview
As per orders of the Delimitation Commission, No. 244 Kashipur Assembly constituency is composed of the following: Kashipur community development block; Hura, Jabarrah, Kalabani, Keshargarh, Ladhurka, Lakhanpur and Rakhera Bishpuri gram panchayats of Hura community development block.

Kashipur Assembly constituency is part of No. 35 Purulia (Lok Sabha constituency). It was earlier part of Bankura (Lok Sabha constituency).

Members of Legislative Assembly

Election results

2021

2016

2011

.# Swing calculated on Congress+Trinamool Congress vote percentages taken together in 2006.

1977–2006
In the 2006, 2001 and 1996 state assembly elections, Rabindranath Hembram of CPI(M) won the Kashipur seat defeating Anath Bandhu Patar of Trinamool Congress, Buddheswar Saren of Trinamool Congress, and Subhas Chandra Patar of Congress respectively. Contests in most years were multi cornered but only winners and runners are being mentioned. Surendranath Majhi of CPI(M) defeated Nandalal Saren of Congress in 1991, Anil Baran Murmu of Congress in 1987, Subhas Chandra Patar of Congress in 1982 and Rampada Majhi of Janata Party in 1977.

1957–1972
Madan Mohan Mahato of Congress won in 1972 and 1971. Prabir Kumar Mallick of CPI won in 1969. N.S.Deo of Congress won in 1967. Budhan Majhi of Congress won in 1962. Ledu Majhi, Independent, and Budhan Majhi, Congress, won the Kashipur joint seat in 1957.

References

Assembly constituencies of West Bengal
Politics of Purulia district